Apple’s EU tax dispute refers to an investigation by the European Commission into tax arrangements between Apple and Ireland, which allowed the company to pay close to zero corporate tax over 10 years.

On 29 August 2016, after a two-year investigation, Margrethe Vestager of the European Commission announced: "Ireland granted illegal tax benefits to Apple". The Commission ordered Apple to pay €13 billion, plus interest, in unpaid Irish taxes from 2004–14 to the Irish state. It was the largest corporate tax fine (in fact a recovery order, technically not a fine) in history. On 7 September 2016, the Irish State secured a majority in Dáil Éireann to reject payment of the back-taxes, which including penalties could reach €20 billion, or 10% of 2014 Irish GDP.  In November 2016, the Irish government formally appealed the ruling, claiming there was no violation of Irish tax law, and that the commission's action was "an intrusion into Irish sovereignty", as national tax policy is excluded from EU treaties. In November 2016, Apple CEO Tim Cook, announced Apple would appeal, and in September 2018, Apple lodged €13 billion to an escrow account, pending appeal. In July 2020, the European General Court struck down EU tax decision as illegal, ruling in favor of Apple.

The issue was Apple's variation of the Double Irish tax system, which, from 2004 to 2014, Apple used to shield €110.8 billion of non–US profits from tax. Apple did not use the standard two separate Irish companies, as Google and other Irish-based US multinationals employ with their Double Irish tax systems, but instead received two rulings from the Irish Revenue Commissioners (in 1991, and again updated in 2007), that it could use a single Irish company, split into two branches. These were private rulings to Apple, not given to other Irish-based US multinationals, and thus charged as illegal Irish state aid by the commission.

On 9 January 2015, Apple informed the Commission that it closed its hybrid–Double Irish, base erosion and profit shifting (BEPS) tool. In Q1 2015, Apple restructured into a new Irish BEPS tool called the Capital Allowances for Intangible Assets (CAIA) tool, also called the Green Jersey.  Apple's Q1 2015 restructuring required a 12 July 2016 restatement of Irish 2015 GDP, which increased it by 26.3 percent (later revised to 34.4 percent); the restatement was called "leprechaun economics", and led to new EU inquiries in 2017, and accusations in June 2018, that Ireland was the world's largest tax haven.

Ireland's rejection of the EU Commission's "windfall" in back-taxes surprised some. In June 2018, the American–Ireland Chamber of Commerce estimated the value of US investment in Ireland was €334 billion, exceeding Irish GDP (€291 billion in 2016).

On 15 July 2020, the European General Court ruled that the Commission "did not succeed in showing to the requisite legal standard" that Apple had received tax advantages from Ireland, and ruled in favour of Apple.

On 25 Sept 2020, Executive Vice-President Margrethe Vestager said they would appeal the decision before the European Court of Justice as the Commission believes the General Court has made a number of errors of law.

Background

History of Apple in Ireland 

On 23 December 1980, Apple opened production facilities in Holyhill, Cork. By 1990, the number of jobs had grown from 700 jobs to 1000 permanent jobs, as well as 500 sub-contractors. Interview excerpts, published by European Commission, found that this information was used in the way of background information by a tax adviser representing Apple during meetings with Apple in 1990.

By November 2016, Apple employed 6,000 people in Ireland, almost all of whom were in the Apple Hollyhill Cork plant. The Cork plant is Apple's only self-operated manufacturing plant in the world (Apple otherwise always contracts to third-party manufacturers).  Holyhill is considered a low-technology facility, building iMacs to order by hand, and in this regard is more akin to a global logistics hub for Apple (albeit located on the island of Ireland). No research is carried out in the facility. Unusually for a plant, over 700 of the 6,000 employees work from home (the largest remote percentage of any Irish technology company).

Apple's unusual Cork plant should be seen in the context of the job thresholds Ireland places on US multinationals making use of the main Irish BEPS tools, discussed here, which provide effective Irish tax rates of 0–2.5%, but require specific employment quotas; and give more "substance" to the BEPS tool.

Apple's Irish structure 

In 2014, Apple's Irish structure consisted of two subsidiaries; Apple Operations Ireland ("AOI") an Irish-registered holding company which acts as an internal financing company. AOI claimed tax residence in Bermuda and thus, is not an Irish tax resident (the use of such a company in corporate tax structuring is sometimes referred to as a "Bermuda Black Hole"). The EU Commission State Aid recovery order does not pertain to AOI.

Apple Sales International ("ASI"), on the other hand, is the focus of the EU Commission's recovery order(and was the focus of 2013 Senate Investigation).  ASI is an Irish-registered subsidiary of Apple Operations Europe ("AOE").  Both AOE and ASI are parties to an Irish advanced pricing agreement which took place in 1991. This agreement was updated in 2007. ASI is the vehicle through which Apple routed €110.8 billion in non–US profits from 2004 to 2014, inclusive.  

ASI's 2014 structure was an adaptation of a Double Irish scheme, an Irish IP–based BEPS tool used by many US multinationals. Apple did not follow the traditional Double Irish structure of using two separate Irish companies. Instead, Apple used two separate "branches" inside one single company, namely ASI. It is this "branch structure" the EU Commission alleged was illegal State aid, as it was not offered to other multinationals in Ireland, which had used the traditional "two separate companies" version of the Double Irish BEPS tool.
Under the Double Irish structure, one Irish subsidiary (IRL1) is an Irish registered company selling products to non–US locations from Ireland. The other Irish subsidiary (IRL2) is "registered" in Ireland, but "managed and controlled" from a tax haven such as Bermuda. The Irish tax code considers IRL2 a Bermuda company (used the "managed and controlled" test), but the US tax code considers IRL2 an Irish company (uses the registration test). Neither taxes it. Apple's subsidiary, ASI, behaved like it was IRL2, it was "managed and controlled" via ASI Board meetings in Bermuda, so Irish Revenue did not tax it. But ASI also did all the functions of IRL1, making circa €110.8 billion of profits from non–US sales. The EU Commission contest IRL1's actions made ASI Irish, and the functions of IRL1 over-rode the Bermuda Board meetings in deciding the "managed and controlled" test. The commission had not brought any cases against US multinationals using the standard double two separate companies Irish BEPS tool.

Apple's unique ASI structure, is believed to be the reason why Apple never had an Apple retail store in the Republic of Ireland (it even has one in smaller Belfast).

EU investigation

Opening (2014) 

In May 2013, Apple's tax practices were examined by a US bipartisan investigation of the Senate Permanent Subcommittee on Investigation. The investigation aimed to examine whether Apple used offshore structures, in conjunction with arrangements, to shift profits from the US to Ireland. Senators Carl Levin and John McCain drew light on what they referred to as a special tax arrangement between Apple and Ireland which allowed Apple to pay a corporate tax rate of less than 2%.

In June 2014, an investigation was opened by the European Commissioner for Competition on behalf of the EU Commission (SA 38373). The Ireland case was opened in conjunction with two other similar cases; involving Starbucks (Netherlands) and Fiat (Luxembourg). The investigation was led for the European Commission by the Slovak national Helena Malikova, together with a small team of four people.
The Commissioners noted concerns that discretion in transfer pricing rules had been used to give Apple selective advantage. They believed that this violated Article 107(1) of the Treaty on the Functioning of the European Union (TFEU). Article 107(1) states that aid granted by member states cannot threaten to distort competition. They examined Irish tax rulings from 1991 and 2007 by the Irish Office of the Revenue Commissioners. The Commission referred to taxable profit allocated to the Irish branches of AOE and ASI. The Commission claimed the pricing arrangement between Apple and Ireland was not supported by an economic assessment and was in part supported by employment considerations.

Finding (2016) 

On 30 August 2016, the Commission released a 4-page press release describing its decision and rationale. The EU Commission's full 130-page report on its State aid findings, including partially redacted information on Apple's Irish business (e.g. profits, employees, Board minutes etc.), was released on 19 December 2016. According to PwC, the full report by the European Commission contained very detailed analysis of the transfer pricing methodology used by Apple.

According to the commission, the tax arrangement between Ireland and Apple qualifies as state aid as it meets the European Union's four criteria:

 There has been an intervention by the State
 This intervention gives the benefactor a competitive advantage on a selective basis
 As a result, competition has been or may be distorted
 The intervention is likely to affect trade between the Member States

The 30 August 2016 press briefing summarised the following findings from the main report:

The 30 August 2016 press briefing made the following statements regarding the financial implications:

Recovery order (2016)

The recovery order for €13 billion was an estimate subject to final ASI accounts. It covers the period 2004 to 2014 inclusive, as the commission is permitted to order a full recovery within a 10-year period from the start of an investigation.  The January 2018 updated estimate of the recovery order had risen to €13.85 billion. The Commission recovery order is simply the estimated profits of, mainly, ASI applied, at the prevailing Irish corporate tax rate of 12.5% (see Table 1 above; and full EU Commission report). In addition, Apple will also owe interest penalties at the Irish Revenue penalty rate (was 8% in 2016), which would total circa €6 billion, giving a total recovery order of circa €20 billion.

A fallback position of the EU Commission's State aid case is that if ASI is not an Irish company, then it was a "stateless" company (given it was "legally" registered in Ireland), and Apple has been remitting royalty payments from EU–28 countries to a company in a jurisdiction with no EU tax treaty.  Apple would, therefore, owe back-taxes to each individual EU country, from which these royalties were paid (and not to Ireland).  As all other EU countries have corporation tax rates materially in excess of Ireland's 12.5% corporation tax rate, the total Apple effective taxes owned, in this scenario, would be materially in excess of €13 billion.  Margrethe Vestager appealed to individual EU taxing authorities to assess this aspect of Apple's State aid case for themselves, on a case-by-case basis.

Appeal (2016–2020) 
In November 2016, in a letter to the Apple community in Europe, Tim Cook said the company would appeal. In the immediate aftermath of the commission's 29 August 2016 ruling, Ireland's finance minister Michael Noonan stated that Ireland would be appealing the decision, subject to cabinet approval. On 2 September 2016, the Irish cabinet voted to approve the appeal. The minority Fine Gael–led government also had to secure a general Dáil Éireann vote on the matter, which it did on 7 September, by a majority of 93 to 36, securing the support of the other main Irish political party, Fianna Fáil. In November 2016, the Irish government also formally notified the EU Commission it would appeal and reject any claim to the €13 billion "windfall".

The appeal will firstly be heard in the EU's General Court, with any further appeal being taken to the EU's highest court; the European Court of Justice.

In August 2018, it was reported that the appeal would begin before the end of 2018, but could take over 5 years, and that Apple had begun to lodge the €13 billion into an escrow account during Q2 2018. On 18 September 2018, it was reported that Apple had lodged the €13 billion, plus another €1.3 billion, into the Irish State's escrow account. In October 2018, the commission announced that it would drop its legal action against Ireland for failure to recover the amount owed by the deadline laid down in the Commission decision  (the deadline was 3 January 2017).

In May 2019, the Irish Public Accounts Committee was told by officials from the Department of Finance that defending the Apple case (i.e. to prevent the payment of the fine to Ireland), had cost the Irish state €7.1 million in mostly legal fees, and that the final case may take a decade to reach a final verdict.

On 15 July 2020, the European General Court (EGC) ruled that the Commission "did not succeed in showing to the requisite legal standard" that Apple had received tax advantages from Ireland, and ruled in favour of Apple. The EGC noted that their ruling can be appealed to the Court of Justice of the European Union, which could take several more years; Apple funds would remain in escrow until such an appeal was concluded.

In September 2020, the European Commission appealed against the court ruling by the European General Court that said Apple did not have to pay €13 billion because the Commission considered that in its judgment the General Court has made a number of errors of law.

Further controversy 

The EU Commission's findings cover the period from 2004 to end 2014, and its report notes that Apple had informed it at the start of 2015 that the controversial hybrid–Double Irish BEPS tool, ASI, had been closed down; which enabled the commission to complete its State aid report, and finalise the recovery order of €13 billion.

In January 2018, economist Seamus Coffey, Chairman of the State's Irish Fiscal Advisory Council, and author of the State's 2017 Review of Ireland's Corporation Tax Code, showed Apple restructured ASI into another Irish IP–based BEPS tool, the Capital Allowances for Intangible Assets ("CAIA"), in Q1 2015.

It is specifically prohibited under Ireland's own corporation tax code (Section 291A(c) of the Irish Taxes and Consolation Act 1997) to use the CAIA BEPS scheme for reasons that are not "commercial bona fide reasons" and in particular for schemes where the main purpose is "... the avoidance of, or reduction in, liability to tax". Given that the CAIA scheme is a deliberate IP–based BEPS tool, it is Ireland tripping over itself trying to maintain OECD-compliance.

The November 2017 Paradise Papers leaks revealed that Apple and its lawyers, Applebys, were looking for a replacement for the ASI structure in 2014. They considered a number of tax havens (especially Jersey). Some of the disclosed documents left little doubt as to the key drivers of Apple's decision making.

If the Irish Revenue waived Section 291A(c) for Apple's 2015 restructuring, it could result in a further EU Commission State Aid investigation.

In January 2018, in a series of articles in The Sunday Business Post, Mr Coffey estimated that since the 2015 restructuring, Apple has avoided Irish corporate taxes totalling circa at €2.5–3bn per annum (at the 12.5% rate). Mr Coffey calculated the potential second EU Apple State aid recovery order for the 2015–2018 (inclusive) period, would therefore reach circa €10bn, excluding any interest penalties.

The Irish financial media further noted that the then Finance Minister Michael Noonan, had increased the tax relief threshold for the Irish CAIA scheme from 80% to 100% in the 2015 budget (i.e. reduce the effective Irish corporate tax rate from 2.5% to 0%).  This was changed back in the subsequent 2017 budget by Finance Minister Paschal Donohoe, however firms which had started their Irish CAIA scheme in 2015 (like Apple), were allowed to stay at the 100% relief level for the duration of their scheme, which can, under certain conditions, be extended indefinitely.

In November 2017, it was reported that the EU Commission had already asked for details on Apple's Irish structure post its January 2015 ruling.

In February 2019, Sinn Féin MEP Matt Carthy discussed Apple's use of the CAIA Irish BEPS tool with Margrethe Vestager.

Irish position

Decision by Ireland to appeal EU's recovery order
After 29 August 2016 ruling, the EU Commission followed up on 31 August to counter statements from the Irish Government that Ireland would have to use the proceeds of any Apple recovery to pay down public sector debt (in line with agreed EU budgetary rules), and to clarify that Ireland could allocate the money in whichever way the Irish Government lawfully saw fit. Regardless however, on 7 September, the Irish minority Government, with material opposition support, rejected the EU Commission's ruling on Apple, and the payment of €13 billion, plus penalties, to the Irish State.

US multinational companies in Ireland

American multinationals play a substantial role in Ireland's economy, attracted by Ireland's BEPS tools, that shield their non–US profits from the historical US "worldwide" corporate tax system. In contrast, multinationals from countries with "territorial" tax systems, by far the most common corporate tax system in the world, don't need to use corporate–tax havens such as Ireland, as their foreign income is taxed at much lower rates.

For example, in 2016–17, US–controlled multinationals in Ireland:

 Directly employed one–quarter of the Irish private sector workforce;
 Created "higher-value" jobs at an average wage of €85k (€17.9 billion wage roll for 210,443 staff) vs. Irish domestic industrial wage of €35k;
 Paid €28.3 billion in 2016 in taxes (€5.5 billion), wages (€17.9 billion on 210,443 staff) and capital spending (€4.9 billion);
 Paid 80 percent of Irish corporation and business taxes, which totalled just over €8 billion;
 Paid circa 50 percent of Irish salary taxes (due to higher paying jobs), 50 percent of Irish VAT, and 92 percent of Irish customs and excise duties;(this was claimed by a leading Irish tax expert (and Past President of the Irish Tax Institute), but is not fully verifiable)
 Created 57 percent of private sector non-farm value-add (40% of value-add in Irish services and 80% of value-add in Irish manufacturing);
 Made up 25 of the top 50 Irish companies, by 2017 turnover (see Table 2, below); the only non–U.S/non–Irish other companies are UK companies which either sell into Ireland, like Tesco, or date from pre–2009, when the UK reformed its corporate tax system to a "territorial" regime.
 American–Ireland Chamber of Commerce estimated the value of US investment in Ireland in 2018 was €334 billion, exceeding Irish GDP (€291 billion in 2016).

From the above table:

Irish media

The role of the Irish media in "framing" the debate around the ethical issues of helping global multinational corporations avoid taxes has been noted. In April 2019, academic research found that "Irish respondents exposed to treatments questioning the morality and fairness of Ireland’s facilitation of Apple tax avoidance are more likely to acknowledge the negative impact on Ireland’s EU neighbours".

Timeline 
 1980 – Apple establishes production facilities in Cork, Ireland. 
 1991 – Irish State agreed the first tax deal with Apple Inc (one of the two rulings cited by the EU Commission).
 2007 – Original 1991 tax agreement is re-negotiated with Irish State (the second ruling cited by the EU Commission).
 2013 – US Senate subcommittee examines offshore profit shifting and tax avoidance by Apple Inc.
 2014 – European Commission opens case against Apple Inc. in Ireland.
 2015 – Apple re-structures its two Irish subsidiaries.
 2016 – European Commission release findings announcing Apple has undue tax benefits owed to Ireland (up to end 2014)
 2016 – Both Apple Inc. and Ireland announce a decision to appeal the ruling.
 2017 – European Commission asks for details of Apple's 2015 re-structuring in Ireland
 2018 – Apple pays the €13bn recovery order (no interest penalty yet) to Ireland (subject to appeal).
 2020 – Apple wins its appeal at the European General Court (ECG).
 2020 – The EU Commission announce they intend to appeal the ECG's decision at the CJEU.

See also 

 Criticism of Apple Inc.
 Corporation tax in the Republic of Ireland
 Ireland as a tax haven
 Modified gross national income replaced Irish GDP/GNP
 Feargal O'Rourke architect of Ireland's BEPS tools
 Matheson (law firm) Ireland's largest US tax advisor
 Qualifying investor alternative investment fund (QIAIF) Irish tax-free vehicles
 Single malt arrangement IP-based BEPS tool
 Section 110 SPV Debt-based BEPS tool
 Conduit and Sink OFCs analysis of tax havens
 Panama as a tax haven
 United States as a tax haven
 James R. Hines Jr., leader in academic research on tax havens
 Dhammika Dharmapala, leader in academic research on tax havens 
 Gabriel Zucman, leader in academic research on tax havens

Notes

References

External links
 PRESS RELEASE: EU Ruling on Apple
 European Commission SA.38373 – Illegal State Aid to Apple

Apple Inc. litigation
International taxation
Corporate tax avoidance
Anti-tax avoidance measures
Taxation in the Republic of Ireland
Economy of the Republic of Ireland
2010s in the European Union
2010s in the Republic of Ireland
Offshore magic circle
2020 in the Republic of Ireland